Pantelimon is derived from the name of Saint Pantaleon and may refer to several places in Romania:

Pantelimon, Bucharest
Pantelimon metro station
Pantelimon, Constanța
Pantelimon, Ilfov